The Calling of Dan Matthews is a 1935 American crime film directed by Phil Rosen and starring Richard Arlen, Charlotte Wynters and Douglass Dumbrille. It was based on the novel of the same title by Harold Bell Wright.

Plot

Cast
 Richard Arlen as Dan Matthews  
 Charlotte Wynters as Hope Strong  
 Douglass Dumbrille as Jeff Hardy  
 Mary Kornman as Kitty Marley  
 Donald Cook as Frank Blair  
 Frederick Burton as James B. Strong  
 Lee Moran as Hypo  
 Tom Dugan as Herman  
 Edward McWade as Lawyer Partington  
 Carlyle Blackwell Jr. as Tommy  
 Oscar Apfel as District Attorney  
 Bess Flowers as Miss Ryan

References

Bibliography
 Goble, Alan. The Complete Index to Literary Sources in Film. Walter de Gruyter, 1999.

External links
 

1935 films
1935 crime drama films
American crime drama films
Columbia Pictures films
Films directed by Phil Rosen
Films based on American novels
American black-and-white films
1930s English-language films
1930s American films